Scopula caducaria is a moth of the family Geometridae first described by Charles Swinhoe in 1904. It is found in the Democratic Republic of the Congo, Ethiopia, Kenya, Malawi and Uganda.

References

Moths described in 1904
caducaria
Moths of Africa